was a professional Go player.

Sato was a 9 dan who played in the Kansai Ki-in. He had many pupils, including Yuki Satoshi, Izumo Tetsuya, Maeda Ryo, and Furuya Yutaka. Sato became a 9 dan in 1963

Titles 

1924 births
2004 deaths
Japanese Go players